Beyond the Last Mountain (1976) is a Pakistani English language film written and directed by Javed Jabbar. It was Pakistan’s first English language film, which was shown at the 6th International Film Festival of India in New Delhi. It was also released in an Urdu language version with the title "Musafir".

Plot
The story is set in the post-1971 disintegrated Pakistan. A young man returns to Karachi from abroad along with his politician father. The father gets assassinated, and the young man embarks on a struggle to unveil the murderers. During his investigations, he meets four young ladies from the upper-middle class who are willing to help him.

Cast and crew
 Usman Peerzada
 Zahoor Ahmed		
 Subhani ba Yunus	
 Mariana Haq	
 Shamim Hilaly	
 Nighat Sultana
 Raja Jameel
 Pia Khan
 Mirza Ghazanfar Begg
 Dear Asghar
 Sohail Rana was the music composer for this film.
 Nazia Hassan & Zoheb Hassan who would go on to become a famous singing duo in the 1980s made cameo appearances in a song in the film.

Filming locations
 Islamabad
 Lyari, Karachi
 Malir, Karachi
 Murree Hills
 Nathia Gali

Soundtracks
The music of the film was composed by Sohail Rana and the lyrics were written by Abaidullah Aleem. Some tracks of the film were:
 Ham Rahi, Aisi Rahon Kay, Jin Ki Koi Manzil Hi Nahin ... Singer: Akhlaq Ahmed
 Woh Chand Chehra, Sitara Ankhen ... Singer: Habib Wali Mohammad

References

External links 
 
Beyond the last Mountain at Pakmag

1976 films
English-language Pakistani films
1970s English-language films